Queen of Angels Church or as locals call it St. Mary's Church is located in Kadagathur village, Tamil Nadu, India. Due to Catholic settlements in 19th century this is one of the oldest parish and second oldest church in its Diocese.

History 
Following riots against Catholics in Pennagaram, there have been many Catholics scattered to different locations. Most of them settled in Tirupattur. Some of them later settled in Kadagathur with the help of local leader Chinnappa Nayakar. He shelters Catholics in his fort and shares a portion of it as a prayer hall for Catholics. Likewise, there is oral tradition that the present St. Antony's church in Kolathur was Chinnappa Nayakar's stable, and his cemetery is present in Kolathur village. Presently, Kolathur is a part of Gollapatti village, and the name Kolathur is no longer used. The church in Gollapatty is St. Mary Magdalene Church, also the church in Pennagaram is St. Mary Magdalene Church, and there was an oral report that the statue in the present Gollapatty church comes from Pennagaram Church.

As part of missionary work, Paris MEP has taken care of the village of Kadagathur following the Jesuits. Fr. MS. Joseph reported that the mass and prayers were conducted within the fort Chinnappa Nayakar. Later Kadagathur came under the parish of Kovilur.  The additional priest of Kovilur has stayed for a few days in Kadagathur to preach. In the 1833s, people of Kolagathur, Selliampatti, Savaloor, Kotavoor, Savadiyur, and Kethampatty attended Kadagathur church. Kotavoor is now a part of Savadiyur.

As early as 1872, Fr. Athanase Pneau MEP and Fr. Dupas MEP have stayed in Kadagathur. During the investigation of Pondicherry Bishop Fr. Laouënan MEP in 1873, there were 400 Catholics around Kadagathur and 300 Catholics around Savadiyur. In 1895 Elathagiri was separated from Koviloor Parish and became new parish church, during this time Kadagathur Parish was annexed under this Elathagiri Deanery.

In 1900 Kadagathur was added to the Kovilur Parish Deanery. The first parish priest of Kadagathur was Fr. Istanish-Laus between 1910 and 1919.  Kadagathur again became a sub-station of Kovilur Parish during 1919–30. In 1930 Salem became a diocese from Pondichery diocese. at this time Fr. Loius Auguste Chevalier of Pondichery diocese became the parish priest of Kadagathur during this time.The Franciscan sisters of Mount Poinsur began their service in Pennagaram in the 1930s. Later, in 1939, they left for Pennagaram, and this service has been continued Kadagathur parish. At that time, Kadagathur Parish extended from Rayakottai to Biligundlu, and it was the largest parish in terms of area. The parish church of Kadagathur was St. Sebastian Church until 1932. In 1932, Fr. Chevallier built this current Queen of Angels Church.

See also
St. Francis Xavier Church, Kovilur
St. Francis Xavier Church, Kethanahalli
Roman Catholic Diocese of Dharmapuri

References

Churches completed in 1932
Churches in Dharmapuri district
Roman Catholic churches in Tamil Nadu